Si Te Vas (Spanish for "If you leave") may refer to:

 Si Te Vas (album), an album by Jon Secada
 "Si Te Vas", the B-side of the song "If You Go" by Jon Secada
 "Si Te Vas" (Paulina Rubio song), a 2016 song by Paulina Rubio
 "Si Te Vas" (Pedro Fernández song), 1994, also performed by Marc Anthony
 "Si Te Vas", a song by Jesse & Joy from the album Electricidad
 "Si Te Vas", a song by Luis Miguel from the album Nada Es Igual...
 "Si Te Vas", a song by Paloma San Basilio
 "Si Te Vas", a song by Sech from the album 1 of 1
 "Si Te Vas", a song by Reik from the album Peligro
 "Si Te Vas", a song by Shakira from the album Dónde Están los Ladrones?
 "Si Te Vas", a song by Vicente Fernández from the album Hoy Platique Con Gallo
 "Si Te Vas", a song by Wisin from the album El Regreso del Sobreviviente
 "Si Te Vas", a song by Zion

See also
Si Tú Te Vas (disambiguation)